35 or XXXV may refer to: 
 35 (number), the natural number following 34 and preceding 36
 one of the years 35 BC, AD 35, 1935, 2035
 XXXV (album), a 2002 album by Fairport Convention
 35xxxv, a 2015 album by One Ok Rock
"35" (song), a 2021 song by New Zealand youth choir Ka Hao
 "Thirty Five", a song by Karma to Burn from the album Almost Heathen, 2001
 III-V, a type of semiconductor material